Willie Eldon O'Ree  (born October 15, 1935) is a Canadian former professional ice hockey player, best known for being the first black player in the National Hockey League (NHL). O'Ree played as a winger for the Boston Bruins. O'Ree is referred to as the "Jackie Robinson of ice hockey" for breaking the black colour barrier in the National Hockey League, and has stated publicly that he had met Jackie Robinson when he was younger. He was inducted into the Hockey Hall of Fame in November 2018.

Also in 2018, the NHL instituted the annual Willie O'Ree Community Hero Award in his honour, to "recognise the individual who has worked to make a positive impact on his community, culture or society to make people better through hockey."

Playing career
O'Ree  played junior hockey for several teams in Quebec and Ontario before being signed by the Quebec Aces of the Quebec Hockey League (QHL) in 1955. Midway through his second minor-league season with the Quebec Aces, O'Ree was called up to the Boston Bruins of the NHL to replace Leo Labine, who was unable to play due to an illness.  Two years earlier, O'Ree had been blinded when he was hit in his right eye by an errant puck; which would have precluded him from playing in the NHL if the Bruins had known. However, O'Ree managed to keep it secret, and made his NHL debut with the Bruins on January 18, 1958, against the Montreal Canadiens, becoming the first black player in league history. He played two games that year, with centre man Don McKenney and right wing Jerry Toppazzini as his line mates. O'Ree played 43 games for the Bruins during the 1960–61 NHL season. An incident occurred during a game from that season against the Chicago Blackhawks in Chicago Stadium. According to O'Ree, he was called racist names by several of the Blackhawks players. During the game, Eric Nesterenko butt-ended O'Ree, knocking out his two front teeth and breaking his nose. O'Ree responded by hitting Nesterenko over the head with his stick, which O'Ree said "almost created a riot". O'Ree remembered that fans called him racist names and that the Blackhawks players were threatening to kill him, and that he was "lucky to get out of the arena alive". After playing the 43 games for the Bruins during that season, O'Ree was then traded to the Montreal Canadiens. O'Ree described the Canadiens were run by racists and that he wasn't invited to try out for the team, but was sent to a minor league team in Hull, Quebec. O'Ree scored 4 goals and 10 assists in his NHL career, all in 1961. 

O'Ree faced racial taunts throughout his hockey career, including in the NHL, especially in the United States. 

He noted that racist remarks were much worse in the U.S. cities than in Toronto and Montreal, the two Canadian cities hosting NHL teams at the time, and that "Fans would yell, 'Go back to the South' and 'How come you're not picking cotton?' Things like that. It didn't bother me. I just wanted to be a hockey player, and if they couldn't accept that fact, that was their problem, not mine."

In the minor leagues, O'Ree won two scoring titles in the Western Hockey League (WHL) between 1961 and 1974, scoring 30 or more goals 4 times, with a high of 38 in 1964–65 and 1968–69. O'Ree played 50 games for the American Hockey League's New Haven Nighthawks in 1972–73. Most of O'Ree's playing time was with the WHL's Los Angeles Blades and San Diego Gulls. The latter team retired his number, which now hangs from the rafters at Pechanga Arena, formerly known as the San Diego Sports Arena. O'Ree continued to play in the minors until the age of 43.

Impact on hockey
After O'Ree's stint in the NHL, there were no other black players in the NHL until another Canadian player, Mike Marson, was drafted by the Washington Capitals in 1974. There were 23 black players in the NHL as of the mid-2010s. Art Dorrington was the first black player to sign an NHL contract, in 1950 with the New York Rangers organisation, but never played beyond the minor league level.. NHL players are now required to enroll in a preseason diversity training seminar, and racially based verbal abuse is punished through suspensions and fines.

Since 1998, O'Ree has been the NHL's Diversity Ambassador, travelling across North America to schools and hockey programs to promote messages of inclusion, dedication, and confidence.

Honours
O'Ree was inducted into the New Brunswick Sports Hall of Fame in 1984. In 1998, O'Ree was working at the Hotel Del Coronado in San Diego, California when the National Hockey League approached him to be the director of youth development for its diversity task force. The NHL/USA Hockey Diversity Task Force is a non-profit program for minority youth that encourages them to learn and play hockey. As of the mid-2000s, O'Ree lives in Berkeley, California. O'Ree and Kevin Weekes appeared in the Everybody Hates Chris episode "Everybody Hates Gretzky" in 2008.

On the afternoon of January 19, 2008, the Bruins and NHL deputy commissioner Bill Daly honoured O'Ree at TD Garden in Boston to mark the 50th anniversary of his NHL debut. In addition, The Sports Museum of New England located in the TD Garden, established a special exhibit on O'Ree's career, comprising many items on loan from his personal collection. Those in attendance included a busload of friends from O'Ree's hometown of Fredericton. Two days earlier, the City of Fredericton honoured him by naming a new sports complex on the North side after him. Around the time of the 60th anniversary of O'Ree's contribution to ice hockey in early 2008, he was once again honoured by the Bruins and the NHL, with a new street hockey rink in Boston named in his honour, one of many accolades with which the Bruins and NHL legend are involved. On January 27, 2008, the NHL also honoured O'Ree during the 56th National Hockey League All-Star Game in Atlanta, Georgia. On February 5, 2008, ESPN did a special on him in honour of Black History Month. On October 29, 2008, San Diego State University presented O'Ree with an Award for Outstanding Commitment to Diversity and Cross Cultural Understanding. In 2008, O'Ree was also inducted by the San Diego Hall of Champions into the Breitbard Hall of Fame honouring San Diego's finest athletes both on and off the playing surface.

The same year, O'Ree received the Order of Canada, the highest civilian award for a Canadian citizen. He was honoured as a pioneer of hockey and dedicated youth mentor in Canada along with the U.S. On June 28, 2011, The Sports Museum at TD Garden in Boston honoured O'Ree with the Hockey Legacy Award at the 10th Annual "The Tradition." Other honourees that evening included Larry Bird, Mike Lowell, and Ty Law. The Buffalo Sabres hosted a Willie O'Ree skills weekend in March 2012. His jersey was retired by the San Diego Gulls on October 16, 2015.

As the 2016 Stanley Cup Finals were about to start, the San Jose Sharks' Barbadian Canadian star right winger Joel Ward was preparing to play against the Pittsburgh Penguins, and told ESPN that O'Ree was one of his inspirations to play pro hockey, and should have his player number 22 retired by the NHL league-wide, just as Jackie Robinson, the first player of color in Major League Baseball has been honoured. Ward himself honoured Robinson's legacy through his last season in NHL play by wearing jersey number 42 in NHL play; Robinson's own player number 42 has been retired league-wide in pro baseball.

On November 3, 2017, O'Ree was honoured with a banner by the Springfield Thunderbirds during a pregame ceremony to commemorate his time with the Springfield Indians.

A more personal honour for O'Ree was arranged by John Grzelcyk, father of current Bruins defenseman Matt Grzelcyk. A long-time member of the Boston Garden and TD Garden "bull-gang" team of arena personnel that assists with "changeovers" for different events at each facility, the senior Grzelcyk had saved an original number 22 Bruins uniform jersey worn by O'Ree from the 1960–61 Boston Bruins season, when O'Ree last played in the NHL as a Bruin. Both Grzelcyks personally presented the jersey to O'Ree, to honour him for his time with the Bruins and the NHL. At about the same time as O'Ree received his vintage Bruins game-sweater, it became known that Madison Bowey, a then-Washington Capitals rookie of bi-racial ethnicity, had been taught by his Black Canadian father about O'Ree's importance in NHL history, and selected 22 as his number with the Capitals to honour O'Ree's achievement.

On June 26, 2018, it was announced that O'Ree would be inducted as a builder into the Hockey Hall of Fame later that year.

Almost ten months after receiving his original Bruins sweater from the Grzelcyks, on November 1, 2018, O'Ree attended the ceremonial dedication of a street hockey rink named in his honour in the Boston neighbourhood of Allston, as part of the continuing legacy of O'Ree's time with the Bruins.

By early May 2019, following O'Ree's builder honour with the Hockey Hall of Fame the previous year, a bill in the 116th U.S. Congress is authorising the award of the United States Congressional Gold Medal for O'Ree's achievements "in recognition of his contributions and commitment to hockey, inclusion, and recreational opportunity."

O'Ree was named to Canada's Sports Hall of Fame on May 27, 2020, in the Builder category. The formal induction ceremony was postponed to October 3, 2021, due to concerns over COVID-19.

On January 12, 2021, the Boston Bruins announced that they would retire O'Ree's number 22 on February 18. However, the jersey retirement ceremony was moved to January 18, 2022, by the NHL.

In 2021, as a celebration of Black History Month, all NHL players wore a commemorative helmet decal honouring O'Ree from January 16 to February 28.

In 2022, US President Joe Biden signed the Willie O'Ree Congressional Gold Medal act. The bill awarded O'Ree a Congressional Gold Medal, the U.S. Congress' highest honour, for his contributions to "hockey, inclusion and recreational opportunity." O'Ree is the first player in NHL history to receive the honour.

Awards
WHL Second All-Star Team (1969)
New Brunswick Sports Hall of Fame (1984)
Lester Patrick Trophy (2003)
Order of New Brunswick (2005)
Willie O'Ree Place (Fredericton arena, dedicated 2008)
Order of Canada (2008)
Breitbard Hall of Fame (2008)
Hockey Hall of Fame (2018)
Canada's Sports Hall of Fame (2020–21)

Career statistics

Regular season and playoffs

Source:

Personal Life 
Willie O'Ree was born on October 15, 1935 in Fredericton, New Brunswick, Canada, and is of Black Canadian and Irish descent. He was the youngest of 13 children of parents Rosebud and Harry. He began playing hockey at a young age and demonstrated a talent for the sport.

See also 
 List of sports desegregation firsts

References

External links

Congressional gold medal to Willie O'Ree 2022.
 Soul on Ice: The Willie O'Ree Story
 Black Players in the NHL
 
 Boston Bruins' Behind the B Episode 508 – Willie O'Ree Receives His #22 Jersey LegendsMember.jsp?mem=b201802&type=Builder&page=bio&list=ByName Willie O'Ree's "Builder" biography page at the Hockey Hall of Fame

1935 births
Black Canadian ice hockey players
Boston Bruins players
Canadian expatriate ice hockey players in the United States
Canadian ice hockey right wingers
Hockey Hall of Fame inductees
Hull-Ottawa Canadiens players
Ice hockey people from New Brunswick
New Brunswick Sports Hall of Fame inductees
Kingston Frontenacs (EPHL) players
Kitchener Canucks players
Lester Patrick Trophy recipients
Living people
Los Angeles Blades (WHL) players
Members of the Order of Canada
Members of the Order of New Brunswick
National Hockey League players with retired numbers
New Haven Nighthawks players
Quebec Aces (QSHL) players
San Diego Gulls (WHL) players